Esku is a village in Põltsamaa Parish, Jõgeva County, Estonia. Esku has a population of 384 (as of 2010).

Esku was built in the Soviet era as the centre of the V. I. Lenin Kolkhoz (named after Vladimir Lenin). It consisted of a big farm and apartment, service and administrative buildings.

References

External links
Website of Esku region (Esku, Lebavere, Nõmavere, Räsna, Rõstla and Vitsjärve villages) 

Villages in Jõgeva County
Kreis Fellin